Chan Sarapich (born 5 April 2002), is a Cambodian footballer currently playing as a right back for Visakha  in the Cambodian Premier League, and the Cambodia national team.

References

External links
 

2002 births
Living people
Cambodian footballers
Cambodia international footballers
People from Sihanoukville province
Association football fullbacks